Leonard L. Amburgey (born 1945) is an American amateur astronomer, discoverer of minor planets and public-school teacher by profession.

On July 2, 2000, he stumbled upon the near-Earth and Apollo asteroid  using a modest telescope in his backyard in Fitchburg, Massachusetts (IAU number 823). As a result, he became the fourth winner of the James Benson Prize for Discovery Methods of Near-Earth Objects by Amateurs.

In 2005, he received the Fitchburg State College (whence he graduated in 1968 and 1973) Alumni Achievement Award.

References

External links 
 Amateur Night in Space, 28 October 2002 (about the Apollo asteroid )

1945 births
20th-century American astronomers
Discoverers of asteroids
Fitchburg State University alumni
Living people